Kobal may refer to:

John Kobal, British film critic
Sinem Kobal, Turkish television and film actress

Turkish-language surnames